The Ministry of Health and Population (MoHP) has its headquarters in Cairo. Khaled Abdel Ghaffar, the current Health Minister, was appointed in August 2022.

Ministers
 Hala Zayed (2018–2022)
 Khaled Abdel Ghaffar (Temporarily) in 2021
 Khaled Abdel Ghaffar (2022–Present)

See also
 Cabinet of Egypt

References

External links
 
Egypt's Cabinet Database

Health
Ministry
Egypt
1936 establishments in Egypt
Government agencies established in 1936